Grady McWhiney (July 15, 1928 – April 18, 2006) was a historian of the American south and the U.S. Civil War.

Early life and education
McWhiney was born in Shreveport, Louisiana, and served in the Marine Corps in 1945. He married in 1947. He attended Centenary College on the G.I. Bill and earned an M.A. in history from Louisiana State University, working with Francis Butler Simkins.  He received his Ph.D. in history from Columbia University in New York, working with David Herbert Donald.

Career
McWhiney's dissertation dealt with Confederate General Braxton Bragg. McWhiney became a noted specialist on the American Civil War era, as well as southern social and economic history. He coauthored Attack and Die with his doctoral student Perry Jamieson. He published Braxton Bragg and Confederate Defeat, in two volumes, as well as many scholarly and popular articles and reviews. He lectured frequently to both academic and popular audiences.

McWhiney and Forrest McDonald were the authors of the "Celtic Thesis," which holds that most Southerners were of Celtic ancestry (as opposed to Anglo-Saxon), and that all groups he declared to be "Celtic" (Scots-Irish, Irish,  Scottish, Welsh and Cornish) were descended from warlike herdsmen, in contrast to the peaceful farmers who predominated in England. They attempted to trace numerous ways in which the Celtic culture shaped social, economic and military behavior.

Attack and Die stressed the ferocity of the Celtic warrior tradition. In "Continuity in Celtic Warfare." (1981), McWhiney argues that an analysis of Celtic warfare from 225 BC to 1865 demonstrates cultural continuity. The Celts repeatedly took high risks that resulted in lost battles and lost wars. Celts were not self-disciplined, patient, or tenacious. They fought boldly but recklessly in the Battles of Telamon (225 BC), Culloden (1746) and Gettysburg (1863). According to their thesis, the South lost the Civil War because Southerners fought like their Celtic ancestors, who were intensely loyal to their leaders but lacked efficiency, perseverance, and foresight.

In 1993 he argued the fundamental differences between North and South developed during the 18th century, when Celtic migrants first settled in the Old South. Some of the fundamental attributes that caused the Old South to adopt anti-English values and practices were Celtic social organization, language, and means of livelihood. It was supposedly the Celtic values and traditions that set the agrarian South apart from the industrialized civilization developing in the North.

However, McWhiney's theories do not address large-scale Irish immigration to New York, Boston, and other northern cities.  They also ignore the degree to which the Southern planter class resembled the English gentry in lineage, religion, and social structure.  Furthermore his work avoids mentioning or acknowledging the fact that the largest group of pre-Revolution immigrants to the Southern colonies were English indentured servants who vastly outnumbered the "Celtic" settlers both in numbers and in cultural influence.

McWhiney taught at Troy State University, Millsaps College, the University of California, Berkeley, Northwestern University, the University of British Columbia, Wayne State University, the University of Alabama, Texas Christian University, The University of Southern Mississippi, and McMurry University. Over a 44-year career, he trained 19 history Ph.Ds.

McWhiney founded the Grady McWhiney Research Foundation, located in Abilene, Texas.

McWhiney was a former director of the League of the South, but he had broken with the group prior to his death.

As historian C. David Dalton has pointed out, he was "Controversial. Unconventional. Influential. These are words easily applied to one of the South's most prominent scholars, Grady McWhiney. For over three decades his writings have been discussed and debated but never disregarded."

References

 Grady McWhiney. Confederate Crackers and Cavaliers. Abilene, Tex.: McWhiney Foundation Press, c. 2002. Pp. 312. , collected essays
 Grady McWhiney. In Cracker Culture: Celtic Ways in the Old South (1988).
McDonald, Forrest and McWhiney, Grady. "The South from Self-sufficiency to Peonage: an Interpretation." American Historical Review 1980 85(5): 1095-1118.  Fulltext: in Jstor and Ebsco. In the major statement of the Celtic Thesis, authors argue in the antebellum South, Celtic peoples found an ideal geopolitical niche to carry on their traditional pastoral lifestyle. This required little work in comparison with tilling the land, and thus Southerners have been thought of as lazy, though their way of life gave them a certain self-sufficiency. After the Civil War, Northerners colonized the South, bringing about substantial changes. Landlords discouraged tenants from raising foodstuffs for their own consumption, for this was unprofitable to the landlords. Furthermore the capacity of the tenants to produce and transport their stock was undermined. This was devastating to the herders, and reduced their status to little better than slaves. Commentary by other historians on pp. 1150–1166.
 McWhiney, Grady and McDonald, Forrest. "Celtic Origins of Southern Herding Practices" Journal of Southern History 1985 51(2): 165-182.  Fulltext in JSTOR
 McWhiney, Grady. "Continuity in Celtic Warfare." Continuity 1981 (2): 1-18. .

Criticisms
Berthoff, Rowland; "Celtic Mist over the South." Journal of Southern History 1986 52(4): 523-546.  with commentary by Forrest McDonald, and Grady McWhiney, pp. 547–548; Fulltext: in Jstor. Berthoff rejects the Celtic Thesis because it exaggerates the numbers and roles of Celtic folk  in the South, fails to define "Celtic," and misunderstands animal husbandry traditions in the British Isles. reply by Berthoff, pp. 548–550.
 Walley, Cherilyn A. "Grady McWhiney's 'Antebellum Piney Woods Culture': the Non-Celtic Origins of Greene County, Mississippi." Journal of Mississippi History 1998 60(3): 223-239.   Argues that census data from Greene County refutes McWhiney's claim that Mississippi's Piney Woods region was predominantly Celtic during the antebellum decades. Surname analysis indicates that most settlers were English, and all settlers were at least one generation removed from their home country. There were no significant differences between the English and Celtic farmers in terms of cattle raising or family size. Also, contrary to McWhiney's arguments, Celtic children attended school at a higher rate than did English children. McWhiney used questionable sources and took evidence out of context to support his claims

External links
McWhiney Foundation
Biography

1928 births
2006 deaths
Writers from Shreveport, Louisiana
United States Marine Corps personnel of World War II
Troy University (New York) faculty
Centenary College of Louisiana alumni
Louisiana State University alumni
Columbia Graduate School of Arts and Sciences alumni
Historians of the Southern United States
Historians of the American Civil War
20th-century American historians
American male non-fiction writers
Southern United States independence activists
Historians from Louisiana
20th-century American male writers
University of California, Berkeley faculty
League of the South